Coline Keriven (born 28 August 2000) is a retired French pair skater. With her former skating partner, Noël-Antoine Pierre, she is a four-time French national medalist (2018, 2020–22) and the 2018 Volvo Open Cup bronze medalist. They competed in the final segment at the 2020 European Championships.

Programs

Competitive highlights 
GP: Grand Prix; CS: Challenger Series

With Bouvart

With Pierre

Ladies' singles

References

External links 
 

2000 births
French female pair skaters
Living people